Hapsiferona is a genus of moths belonging to the family Tineidae.

Species
Some species of this genus are:
Hapsiferona arabica 	Gaedike, 2009
Hapsiferona glareosa 	(Meyrick, 1912)
Hapsiferona jemenitica 	Gaedike, 2014
Hapsiferona remanei 	Gaedike, 2014

References

Hapsiferinae
Tineidae genera